Wullersdorf is a town in the district of Hollabrunn in Lower Austria, Austria.

Geography
Wullersdorf lies in the Weinviertel in Lower Austria. About 4.16 percent of the municipality is forested.

References

Cities and towns in Hollabrunn District